The 1st Confederate States Congress, consisting of the Confederate States Senate and the Confederate States House of Representatives, met from February 18, 1862, to February 17, 1864, during the first two years of Jefferson Davis's presidency, at the Virginia State Capitol in Richmond, Virginia.

Sessions
Held February 18, 1862, through February 17, 1864, at the Virginia State Capitol in Richmond, Virginia
 1st Session – February 18, 1862 to April 21, 1862
 2nd Session – August 18, 1862 to October 13, 1862
 3rd Session – January 12, 1863 to May 1, 1863
 4th Session – December 7, 1863 to February 17, 1864

Leadership

Senate

 President: Alexander H. Stephens
 President pro tempore: R. M. T. Hunter

House

 Speaker: Thomas S. Bocock

Officers

Senate
 Secretary: James H. Nash, South Carolina
 Assistant Secretary: Edward H. Stephens, Virginia
 Journal Clerk: C. T. Bruen, Virginia
 Recording Clerk: Henry H. Hubbard, Mossy Creek, Tennessee
 Sergeant-at-Arms: Lafayette H. Fitzhugh, Kentucky
 Doorkeeper: James Page, North Carolina
 Assistant Doorkeeper: John Wadsworth, Georgia

House
 Clerk: Robert Emmett Dixon Sr., Georgia (died April 24, 1863)
 Albert Reese Lamar, Georgia — sessions 3 and 4
 Assistant Clerk: James McDonald, Virginia
 Assistant Clerk: David Louis Dalton, Alabama — sessions 3 and 4
 Doorkeeper: Robert Harrison Wynne, Alabama

Members

Senate
Confederate States senators were elected by the state legislatures, or appointed by state governors to fill casual vacancies until the legislature elected a new senator. It was intended that one-third of the Senate would begin new six-year terms with each Congress after the first. 

Preceding the names in the list below are Senate class numbers, which indicate the cycle of their terms. In this Congress, all senators were newly elected. Senators of Class 1 served a two-year term, expiring at the end of this Congress, requiring a new election for the 1864–1870 term. Class 2 senators served what was intended to be a four-year term, due to end on the expiry of the next Congress in 1866. Class 3 senators were meant to serve a six-year term, due to expire at the end of the Third Confederate Congress in 1868. As the Confederate Congress lasted less than four full years, the distinction between classes 2 and 3 was ultimately academic.

The members of the classes were selected by the drawing of lots, which was done during the meeting of the Senate on February 21, 1862.

Alabama
 1. Clement Claiborne Clay
 3. William Lowndes Yancey (died July 23, 1863)
 Robert Jemison Jr. (took his seat on December 28, 1863 - Elected to fill vacancy)

Arkansas
 1. Robert Ward Johnson
 3. Charles Burton Mitchel

Florida
 1. James McNair Baker
 2. Augustus Emmet Maxwell

Georgia
 3. Benjamin Harvey Hill
 1. Robert Augustus Toombs (elected but refused to serve)
 John Wood Lewis Sr. (took his seat on  April 7, 1862 - Appointed to serve until the place could be filled)
 Herschel Vespasian Johnson (took his seat on January 19, 1863 - Elected to fill vacancy)

Kentucky
 3. Henry Cornelius Burnett
 1. William Emmet Simms

Louisiana
 2. Thomas Jenkins Semmes
 3. Edward Sparrow

Mississippi
 2. Albert Gallatin Brown
 1. James Phelan Sr.

Missouri
 1. John Bullock Clark Sr.
 2. Robert Ludwell Yates Peyton (died September 3, 1863)
 Waldo Porter Johnson (took his seat on December 24, 1863 - Appointed to fill vacancy)

North Carolina
 1. George Davis (resigned in January 1864 to become CS Attorney General)
 Edwin Godwin Reade (took his seat on January 22, 1864 - Appointed to fill vacancy)
 2. William Theophilus Dortch

South Carolina
 2. Robert Woodward Barnwell
 3. James Lawrence Orr

Tennessee
 3. Landon Carter Haynes
 2. Gustavus Adolphus Henry Sr.

Texas
 3. William Simpson Oldham Sr.
 2. Louis Trezevant Wigfall

Virginia
 3. R. M. T. Hunter
 2. William Ballard Preston (died November 16, 1862)
 Allen Taylor Caperton (took his seat on January 22, 1864 - Elected to fill vacancy)

House of Representatives
X: Originally member of the Provisional Confederate Congress

The names of members of the House of Representatives are preceded by their district numbers.

Alabama
 1. Thomas Jefferson Foster
 2. William Russell Smith
 3. John Perkins Ralls
 4. Jabez Lamar Monroe Curry X
 5. Francis Strother Lyon
 6. William Parish Chilton Sr. X
 7. David Clopton
 8. James Lawrence Pugh
 9. Edmund Strother Dargan

Arkansas
 1. Felix Ives Batson
 2. Grandison Delaney Royston
 3. Augustus Hill Garland X
 4. Thomas Burton Hanly

Florida
 1. James Baird Dawkins (resigned December 8, 1862)
John Marshall Martin (took his seat on  March 25, 1863 - Elected to fill vacancy on February 2, 1863)
 2. Robert Benjamin Hilton

Georgia
 1. Julian Hartridge
 2. Charles James Munnerlyn
 3. Hines Holt (resigned March 1, 1863 after third session)
Porter Ingram (took his seat on January 12, 1864 - Elected to fill vacancy on December 7, 1863)
 4. Augustus Holmes Kenan X
 5. David William Lewis
 6. William White Clark
 7. Robert Pleasant Trippe
 8. Lucius Jeremiah Gartrell
 9. Hardy Strickland
 10. Augustus Romaldus Wright X

Kentucky
 1. Willis Benson Machen
 2. John Watkins Crockett Jr.
 3. Henry English Read
 4. George Washington Ewing X
 5. James Chrisman
 6. Theodore Legrand BurnettX
 7. Horatio Washington Bruce
 8. George Baird Hodge X
 9. Eli Metcalfe Bruce
 10. James William Moore
 11. Robert Jefferson Breckinridge Jr.
 12. John Milton Elliott X

Louisiana
 1. Charles Jacques Villeré
 2. Charles Magill Conrad X
 3. Duncan Farrar Kenner X
 4. Lucius Jacques Dupré
 5. Henry Marshall X
 6. John Perkins Jr. X

Mississippi
 1. Jeremiah Watkins Clapp
 2. Reuben Davis (resigned March 1, 1863 after third session)
William Dunbar Holder (took his seat on January 21, 1864 - Elected to fill vacancy)
 3. Israel Victor Welch
 4. Henry Cousins Chambers
 5. Otho Robards Singleton
 6. Ethelbert Barksdale
 7. John Jones McRae

Missouri
In Confederate law, the people of Missouri were entitled to elect thirteen representatives. The state never implemented the reapportionment and continued to use its existing seven districts. Pending an election, the appointed members of the delegation to the Provisional Congress were assigned to serve in the First Congress. No election was held, so the appointed members served throughout the Congress.
 1. William Mordecai Cooke Sr. X (died September 3, 1863)
 2. Thomas Alexander Harris X
 3. Caspar Wistar Bell X
 4. Aaron H. Conrow X
 5. George Graham Vest X
 6. Thomas W. Freeman X
 7. Representative-elect John Hyer never took his seat; the district was unrepresented for the entire First Congress;

North Carolina
 1. William Nathan Harrell Smith
 2. Robert Rufus Bridgers
 3. Owen Rand Kenan
 4. Thomas David Smith McDowell X
 5. Archibald Hunter Arrington
 6. James Robert McLean
 7. Thomas Samuel Ashe
 8. William Lander
 9. Burgess Sidney Gaither
 10. Allen Turner Davidson X

South Carolina
 1. John McQueen
 2. William Porcher Miles X
 3. Lewis Malone Ayer Jr.
 4. Milledge Luke Bonham (resigned October 13, 1862 after second session)
William Dunlap Simpson (took his seat on February 5, 1863 - Elected to fill vacancy on January 20, 1863)
 5. James Farrow
 6. William Waters Boyce X

Tennessee
 1. Joseph Brown Heiskell (resigned February 6, 1864)
 2. William Graham Swan
 3. William Henry Tibbs
 4. Erasmus Lee Gardenhire
 5. Henry Stuart Foote
 6. Meredith Poindexter Gentry
 7. George Washington Jones
 8. Thomas Menees
 9. John DeWitt Clinton Atkins X
 10. John Vines Wright
 11. David Maney Currin X

Texas
 1. John Allen Wilcox (died February 7, 1864)
 2. Caleb Claiborne Herbert
 3. Peter W. Gray
 4. Franklin Barlow Sexton
 5. Malcolm D. Graham
 6. William Bacon Wright

Virginia
 1. Muscoe Russell Hunter Garnett (died February 14, 1864)
 2. John Randolph Chambliss Sr.
 3. James Lyons (Representative-elect John Tyler died on January 18, 1862, before the Congress started. Lyons was elected on February 10, 1862.)
 4. Roger Atkinson Pryor  X (resigned April 5, 1862)
Charles Fenton Collier (took his seat on August 18, 1862 - Elected to fill vacancy in May 1862)
 5. Thomas Stanley Bocock X
 6. John Goode Jr.
 7. James Philemon Holcombe
 8. Daniel Coleman DeJarnette Sr.
 9. William "Extra Billy" Smith (resigned April 4, 1863)
David Funsten (took his seat on December 7, 1863 - Elected to fill vacancy)
 10. Alexander Boteler X
 11. John Brown Baldwin
 12. Waller Redd Staples X
 13. Walter Preston X
 14. Albert Gallatin Jenkins (resigned April 21, 1862 after first session)
Samuel Augustine Miller (took his seat on February 24, 1863 - Elected to fill vacancy)
 15. Robert Johnston X
 16. Charles Wells Russell X

Delegates
Non voting members of the House of Representatives.

Arizona Territory
 Marcus H. MacWillie

Cherokee Nation
 Elias Cornelius Boudinot X

Choctaw Nation
 Robert McDonald Jones

Senate committees
Accounts

Charles Burton Mitchel, Arkansas, Chairman
William Theophilus Dortch, North Carolina
William Emmett Simms, Kentucky
Allen Taylor Caperton, Virginia — temporary, session 3
Robert Ward Johnson, Arkansas —temporary, session 3

Claims

George Davis, North Carolina, Chairman (resigned January 11, 1864)
Henry Cornelius Burnett, Kentucky
Robert Ludwell Yates Peyton, Missouri (died September 3, 1863)
Waldo Porter Johnson, Missouri — session 4
James McNair Baker, Florida — session 4
Robert Jemison Jr., Alabama — temporary, session 4

Commerce

Clement Claiborne Clay, Alabama, Chairman
Augustus Emmett Maxwell, Florida
William Theophilus Dortch, North Carolina
Robert Ludwell Yates Peyton, Missouri (died September 3, 1863)
Henry Cornelius Burnett, Kentucky — sessions 1 and 2
James McNair Baker, Florida — session 3
William Simpson Oldham Sr., Texas — sessions 3 and 4
James Lawrence Orr, South Carolina — session 4

Engrossment and Enrollment

Landon Carter Haynes Sr., Tennessee, Chairman — session 1 (appointed, but substituted by James Phelan)
James Phelan, Mississippi, Chairman — sessions 1 and 2
William Theophilus Dortch, North Carolina, Chairman — sessions 3 and 4
Augustus Emmett Maxwell, Florida
Charles Burton Mitchel, Arkansas — sessions 1 and 2
Robert Ludwell Yates Peyton, Missouri — session 2
James McNair Baker, Florida — session 2
Allen Taylor Caperton, Virginia — sessions 3 and 4

Finance

Robert Woodward Barnwell, South Carolina, Chairman
Thomas Jenkins Semmes, Louisiana
Robert Mercer Taliaferro Hunter, Virginia
George Davis, North Carolina (resigned January 11, 1864)
Gustavus Adolphus Henry Sr., Tennessee — sessions 1 and 2
John Wood Lewis Sr., Georgia — session 2
Herschel Vespasian Johnson, Georgia — sessions 3 and 4
Edwin Godwin Reade, North Carolina — session 4
Robert Jemison Jr., Alabama — temporary, session 4

Foreign Affairs

James Lawrence Orr, South Carolina, Chairman
John Bullock Clark Sr., Missouri
Louis Trezevant Wigfall, Texas
William Lowndes Yancey, Alabama (died July 26, 1863)
William Ballard Preston, Virginia (died November 16, 1862)
Robert M. T. Hunter, Virginia — session 3
Augustus Emmet Maxwell, Florida — sessions 3 and 4
Herschel Vespasian Johnson, Georgia — session 4

Indian Affairs

Robert Ward Johnson, Arkansas, Chairman
William Emmett Simms, Kentucky
William Simpson Oldham Sr., Texas
Clement Claiborne Clay, Alabama — sessions 1 and 2
Robert Ludwell Yates Peyton, Missouri — sessions 1 and 2
John Bullock Clark Sr., Missouri — sessions 3 and 4
James Phelan, Mississippi — sessions 3 and 4

Judiciary

Benjamin Harvey Hill, Georgia, Chairman
Thomas Jenkins Semmes, Louisiana
Landon Carter Haynes Sr., Tennessee
James Phelan, Mississippi
Henry Cornelius Burnett, Kentucky — sessions 1 and 2
Allen Taylor Caperton, Virginia — sessions 3 and 4

Military Affairs

Edward Sparrow, Louisiana, Chairman
Gustavus Adolphus Henry Sr., Tennessee
Louis Trezevant Wigfall, Texas
Robert Ward Johnson, Arkansas — sessions 1 and 2
William Ballard Preston, Virginia — sessions 1 and 2
Clement Claiborne Clay, Alabama — sessions 3 and 4
Henry Cornelius Burnett, Kentucky — sessions 3 and 4

Naval Affairs

Albert Gallatin Brown, Mississippi, Chairman
William Theophilus Dortch, North Carolina
William Emmett Simms, Kentucky
James McNair Baker, Florida
Henry Cornelius Burnett, Kentucky — temporary, session 1
Benjamin Harvey Hill, Georgia — temporary, session 1
George Davis, North Carolina — temporary, sessions 1 and 2
William Simpson Oldham Sr., Texas —sessions 1 and 2
Robert Ward Johnson, Arkansas — session 2
Augustus Emmett Maxwell, Florida — session 3
William Lowndes Yancey, Alabama (died July 26, 1863) — session 3
Herschel Vespasian Johnson, Georgia — sessions 3 and 4
Robert Jemison Jr., Alabama — session 4

Patents

Augustus Emmett Maxwell, Florida, Chairman
Benjamin Harvey Hill, Georgia
Landon Carter Haynes Sr., Tennessee

Pay and Mileage (Session 1)

Henry Cornelius Burnett, Kentucky, Chairman
Gustavus Adolphus Henry Sr., Tennessee
James Lawrence Orr, South Carolina

Post Offices and Post Roads

William Simpson Oldham Sr., Texas, Chairman
Landon Carter Haynes Sr., Tennessee
Charles Burton Mitchel, Arkansas
James McNair Baker, Florida
John Bullock Clark Sr., Missouri — sessions 1, 2, and 4
James Phelan, Mississippi — session 1 (appointed but substituted by Landon Carter Haynes)
William Emmett Simms, Kentucky —session 1 (appointed but declined)
John Wood Lewis Sr., Georgia — session 2
Robert Ludwell Yates Peyton, Missouri (died September 3, 1863) — session 3
Herschel Vespasian Johnson, Georgia — temporary, session 3

Printing

James Phelan, Mississippi, Chairman
Benjamin Harvey Hill, Georgia
John Bullock Clark Sr., Missouri — sessions 1, 2, and 4
Landon Carter Haynes Sr., Tennessee — sessions 3 and 4

Public Lands

John Bullock Clark Sr., Missouri, Chairman
James McNair Baker, Florida
William Lowndes Yancey, Alabama (died July 26, 1863) — sessions 1, 2, and 3

Rules (Session 1)

James Lawrence Orr, South Carolina, Chairman
Clement Claiborne Clay, Alabama
Robert Ward Johnson, Arkansas

Territories

Louis Trezevant Wigfall, Texas, Chairman
Albert Gallatin Brown, Mississippi
William Lowndes Yancey, Alabama — sessions 1 and 2
John Bullock Clark Sr., Missouri — sessions 3 and 4

House committees
Accounts

John McQueen, 1st South Carolina, Chairman
Owen Rand Kenan, 3rd North Carolina
Thomas Burton Hanly, 4th Arkansas
Thomas Jefferson Foster, 1st Alabama
Hardy Strickland, 9th Georgia
Willis Benson Machen, 1st Kentucky — session 3

Claims

William "Extra Billy" Smith, 9th Virginia, Chairman (resigned April 4, 1863) — sessions 1 and 3
David Clopton, 7th Alabama
Jeremiah Watkins Clapp, 1st Mississippi
James Robert McLean, 6th North Carolina
Charles James Munnerlyn, 2nd Georgia
James Farrow, 5th South Carolina
Theodore Legrand Burnett, 6th Kentucky
Erasmus Lee Gardenhire, 4th Tennessee
Charles Jacques Villeré, 1st Louisiana — sessions 1, 2, and 3
Henry Marshall, 5th Louisiana (appointed but declined) — session 3
William Dunlap Simpson, 4th South Carolina — sessions 3 and 4
Thomas Burton Hanly, 4th Arkansas — session 4
William Bacon Wright, 6th Texas — session 4

Commerce

Jabez Lamar Monroe Curry, 4th Alabama, Chairman
Henry Cousins Chambers, 4th Mississippi
Robert Pleasant Trippe, 7th Georgia
Horatio Washington Bruce, 7th Kentucky
Thomas David Smith McDowell, 4th North Carolina
Charles Jacques Villeré, 1st Louisiana
Franklin Barlow Sexton, 4th Texas
James Lyons, 3rd Virginia
William Mordecai Cooke Sr., 1st Missouri (died September 3, 1863) — sessions 1, 2, and 3
Charles Fenton Collier, 4th Virginia — session 2
Julian Hartridge, 1st Georgia — session 2

Currency (Session 4)

William Waters Boyce, 6th South Carolina, Chairman
Francis Strother Lyon, 5th Alabama
James Lawrence Pugh, 8th Alabama
Charles Magill Conrad, 2nd Louisiana
Robert Rufus Bridgers, 2nd North Carolina
George Washington Jones, 7th Tennessee
Peter W. Gray, 3rd Texas
John Brown Baldwin, 11th Virginia
Robert Johnston, 15th Virginia

Elections

William Nathan Harrell Smith, 1st North Carolina, Chairman
Jabez Lamar Monroe Curry, 4th Alabama
Jeremiah Watkins Clapp, 1st Mississippi
George Graham Vest, 5th Missouri
Robert Pleasant Trippe, 7th Georgia
John Watkins Crockett Jr., 2nd Kentucky
Erasmus Lee Gardenhire, 4th Tennessee
James Baird Dawkins, 1st Florida (resigned December 8, 1862) — sessions 1 and 2
Waller Redd Staples, 12th Virginia — sessions 1, 3, and 4

Enrolled Bills

John Milton Elliott, 12th Kentucky, Chairman
Henry Cousins Chambers, 4th Mississippi
John Goode Jr., 6th Virginia — temporary, session 1
Erasmus Lee Gardenhire, 4th Tennessee — temporary, sessions 1, 2, and 4
William Henry Tibbs, 3rd Tennessee — sessions 1, 2, and 3
Augustus Hill Garland, 3rd Arkansas — session 3
John Allen Wilcox, 1st Texas — session 3
Horatio Washington Bruce, 7th Kentucky — temporary, sessions 3 and 4
Thomas W. Freeman, 6th Missouri — session 4
Thomas Burton Hanly, 4th Arkansas — session 4
William Bacon Wright, 6th Texas — session 4

Foreign Affairs

Henry Stuart Foote, 5th Tennessee, Chairman
William Russell Smith, 2nd Alabama
Robert Jefferson Breckinridge Jr., 11th Kentucky
John Perkins Jr., 6th Louisiana
Ethelbert Barksdale, 6th Mississippi
James Robert McLean, 6th North Carolina
John McQueen, 1st South Carolina
Daniel Coleman DeJarnette Sr., 8th Virginia
Walter Preston, 13th Virginia

Indian Affairs

Otho Robards Singleton, 5th Mississippi, Chairman
John Perkins Ralls, 3rd Alabama
Thomas Burton Hanly, 4th Arkansas
John Milton Elliott, 12th Kentucky
Lucius Jacques Dupré, 4th Louisiana
Archibald Hunter Arrington, 5th North Carolina
William Henry Tibbs, 3rd Tennessee
William Bacon Wright, 6th Texas
John Goode Jr., 6th Virginia
Elias Cornelius Boudinot, Cherokee Nation — session 4

Judiciary

Lucius Jeremiah Gartrell, 8th Georgia, Chairman
Edmund Strother Dargan, 9th Alabama
Augustus Hill Garland, 3rd Arkansas
James William Moore, 10th Kentucky
Thomas Samuel Ashe, 7th North Carolina
Joseph Brown Heiskell, 1st Tennessee (resigned February 6, 1864)
James Philemon Holcombe, 7th Virginia
Charles Wells Russell, 16th Virginia

Medical Department (Sessions 2 - 4)

Augustus Romaldus Wright, 10th Georgia, Chairman
John Perkins Ralls, 3rd Alabama
Grandison Delaney Royston, 2nd Arkansas — sessions 2 and 3
Augustus Hill Garland, 3rd Arkansas — temporary, session 4
Porter Ingram, 3rd Georgia — temporary, session 4
James Chrisman, 5th Kentucky
Caspar Wistar Bell, 3rd Missouri
William Nathan Harrell Smith, 1st North Carolina
James Farrow, 5th South Carolina
Thomas Menees, 8th Tennessee
John Goode Jr., 6th Virginia

Military Affairs

William Porcher Miles, 2nd South Carolina, Chairman
James Lawrence Pugh, 8th Alabama
Robert Benjamin Hilton, 2nd Florida
Augustus Holmes Kenan, 4th Georgia
Eli Metcalfe Bruce, 9th Kentucky
Charles Jacques Villeré, 1st Louisiana
Henry Cousins Chambers, 4th Mississippi
Thomas Alexander Harris, 2nd Missouri
Robert Rufus Bridgers, 2nd North Carolina
William Graham Swan, 2nd Tennessee
John Allen Wilcox, 1st Texas (died February 7, 1864)
Reuben Davis, 2nd Mississippi — session 1
Roger Atkinson Pryor, 4th Virginia (resigned April 5, 1862) — session 1
Caspar Wistar Bell, 3rd Missouri — temporary, session 1
Felix Ives Batson, 1st Arkansas — sessions 1, 2, and 3

Naval Affairs

Charles Magill Conrad, 2nd Louisiana, Chairman
David Clopton, 7th Alabama
Augustus Romaldus Wright, 10th Georgia
Burgess Sidney Gaither, 9th North Carolina
William Waters Boyce, 6th South Carolina
David Maney Currin, 11th Tennessee
John Randolph Chambliss Sr., 2nd Virginia
Charles Wells Russell, 16th Virginia — session 1
James Baird Dawkins, 1st Florida (resigned December 8, 1862) — sessions 1 and 2
William "Extra Billy" Smith, 9th Virginia, (resigned April 4, 1863) — sessions 1 and 3
George Baird Hodge, 8th Kentucky — sessions 2 and 3
John Marshall Martin, 1st Florida — sessions 3 and 4
Charles Fenton Collier, 4th Virginia — session 4
Thomas W. Freeman, 6th Missouri
Charles James Munnerlyn, 2nd Georgia — temporary, session 4

Ordnance and Ordnance Stores (Sessions 2 - 4)

Alexander Boteler, 10th Virginia, Chairman
David Clopton, 7th Alabama
Julian Hartridge, 1st Georgia
Charles Magill Conrad, 2nd Louisiana
Jeremiah Watkins Clapp, 1st Mississippi
John Vines Wright, 10th Tennessee
Caleb Claiborne Herbert, 2nd Texas — sessions 2 and 3
George Baird Hodge, 8th Kentucky — sessions 2 and 3
William Mordecai Cooke Sr., 1st Missouri (died September 3, 1863) — sessions 2 and 3
Lewis Malone Ayer Jr., 3rd South Carolina — session 4

Patents

Caspar Wistar Bell, 3rd Missouri, Chairman
William Parish Chilton Sr., 6th Alabama
Robert Benjamin Hilton, 2nd Florida
Hardy Strickland, 9th Georgia
Henry English Read, 3rd Kentucky
Henry Marshall, 5th Louisiana
William Lander, 8th North Carolina
William Bacon Wright, 6th Texas
Waller Redd Staples, 12th Virginia — sessions 1, 3, and 4

Pay and Mileage (Sessions 1 - 2)

Theodore Legrand Burnett, 6th Kentucky, Chairman
Augustus Romaldus Wright, 10th Georgia
Otho Robards Singleton, 5th Mississippi
Robert Rufus Bridgers, 2nd North Carolina (appointed but replaced by Augustus Romaldus Wright due to extended absence) — session 1
Israel Victor Welch, 3rd Mississippi — session 2

Post Offices and Post Roads

William Parish Chilton Sr., 6th Alabama, Chairman
Robert Benjamin Hilton, 2nd Florida
William White Clark, 6th Georgia
Aaron H. Conrow, 4th Missouri
Allen Turner Davidson, 10th North Carolina
John DeWitt Clinton Atkins, 9th Tennessee
Robert Johnston, 15th Virginia
Israel Victor Welch, 3rd Mississippi — sessions 1 and 2
Grandison Delaney Royston, 2nd Arkansas — sessions 1, 2, and 3
Caleb Claiborne Herbert, 2nd Texas — sessions 1, 2, and 3
Thomas Burton Hanly, 4th Arkansas — session 4

Printing

Ethelbert Barksdale, 6th Mississippi, Chairman
Augustus Romaldus Wright, 10th Georgia
Lucius Jacques Dupré, 4th Louisiana
Thomas Menees, 8th Tennessee
Albert Gallatin Jenkins, 14th Virginia (resigned April 21, 1862) — session 1
David Funsten, 9th Virginia — session 4
David William Lewis, 5th Georgia — temporary, session 4
William Russell Smith, 2nd Alabama — temporary, session 4

Public Buildings

James Lyons, 3rd Virginia, Chairman
James Lawrence Pugh, 8th Alabama
David Maney Currin, 11th Tennessee

Quartermaster's and Commissary Departments and Military Transportation (Sessions 2 - 4)

William Parish Chilton Sr., 6th Alabama, Chairman
William White Clark, 6th Georgia
John Jones McRae, 7th Mississippi
William Lander, 8th North Carolina
Lewis Malone Ayer Jr., 3rd South Carolina
Franklin Barlow Sexton, 4th Texas
Walter Preston, 13th Virginia
James Baird Dawkins, 1st Florida (resigned December 8, 1862) — session 2
Henry Marshall, 5th Louisiana — sessions 2 and 3
Grandison Delaney Royston, 2nd Arkansas — session 3
Allen Turner Davidson, 10th North Carolina — temporary, session 3; permanent, session 4
Israel Victor Welch, 3rd Mississippi — temporary, session 4
Henry Stuart Foote, 5th Tennessee — session 4
Robert Pleasant Trippe, 7th Georgia — session 4
Thomas Burton Hanly, 4th Arkansas — session 4

Rules and Officers of the House (Sessions 1 - 3)

George Washington Jones, 7th Tennessee, Chairman
David William Lewis, 5th Georgia
John Perkins Jr., 6th Louisiana
William Nathan Harrell Smith, 1st North Carolina
Alexander Boteler, 10th Virginia

Territories and Public Lands

John Allen Wilcox, 1st Texas, Chairman (died February 7, 1864)
Thomas Jefferson Foster, 1st Alabama
David William Lewis, 5th Georgia
George Washington Ewing, 4th Kentucky
Henry Marshall, 5th Louisiana
Thomas W. Freeman, 6th Missouri
Thomas Menees, 8th Tennessee
Albert Gallatin Jenkins, 14th Virginia (resigned April 21, 1862) —session 1
Felix Ives Batson, 1st Arkansas — sessions 1, 2, and 3
Samuel Augustine Miller, 14th Virginia — session 4

War Tax (Session 2)

Lewis Malone Ayer Jr., 3rd South Carolina, Chairman
Francis Strother Lyon, 5th Alabama
Thomas Burton Hanly, 4th Arkansas
Robert Benjamin Hilton, 2nd Florida
William White Clark, 6th Georgia
James Chrisman, 5th Kentucky
Israel Victor Welch, 3rd Mississippi
Aaron H. Conrow, 4th Missouri
William Lander, 8th North Carolina
Joseph Brown Heiskell, 1st Tennessee
Franklin Barlow Sexton, 4th Texas
Charles Fenton Collier, 4th Virginia

Ways and Means

Duncan Farrar Kenner, 3rd Louisiana, Chairman — sessions 1, 2, and 3
Francis Strother Lyon, 5th Alabama
Willis Benson Machen, 1st Kentucky
John Jones McRae, 7th Mississippi
George Washington Jones, 7th Tennessee
Malcolm D. Graham, 5th Texas
John Brown Baldwin, 11th Virginia
Muscoe Russell Hunter Garnett, 1st Virginia — session 1
Milledge Luke Bonham, 4th South Carolina (resigned October 13, 1862) — session 1 and 2
Hines Holt, 3rd Georgia (resigned March 1, 1863) — sessions 1, 2, and 3
William Waters Boyce, 6th South Carolina — sessions 3 and 4
Julian Hartridge, 1st Georgia — session 4
John Perkins Jr., 6th Louisiana — session 4

Joint committees
Buildings (Session 1)

Senators
Henry Cornelius Burnett, Kentucky, Chairman
James McNair Baker, Florida
George Davis, North Carolina
Representatives
James Lyons, 3rd Virginia, Chairman
James Lawrence Pugh, 8th Alabama
David Maney Currin, 11th Tennessee

Engrossment and Enrollment (Session 1)

Senators
James Phelan Sr., Mississippi, Chairman
Charles Burton Mitchel, Arkansas
Augustus Emmet Maxwell, Florida
 Representatives
 John Milton Elliott, 12th Kentucky, Chairman
 Henry Cousins Chambers, 4th Mississippi
 William Henry Tibbs, 3rd Tennessee
 Erasmus Lee Gardenhire, 4th Tennessee — temporary

Flag and Seal (Sessions 1 - 3)

Senators
Thomas Jenkins Semmes, Louisiana, Chairman
James Lawrence Orr, South Carolina
William Ballard Preston, Virginia (died November 16, 1862) — sessions 1 and 2
Louis Trezevant Wigfall, Texas — session 3
 Representatives
 Alexander Boteler, 10th Virginia, Chairman
 William Russell Smith, 2nd Alabama
 Peter W. Gray, 3rd Texas

Inauguration (Session 1)

Senators
James Lawrence Orr, South Carolina, Chairman
Albert Gallatin Brown, Mississippi
Gustavus Adolphus Henry Sr., Tennessee
 Representatives
 James Lyons, 3rd Virginia, Chairman
 Francis Strother Lyon, 5th Alabama
 Felix Ives Batson, 1st Arkansas
 Robert Benjamin Hilton, 2nd Florida
 Hines Holt, 3rd Georgia
 Horatio Washington Bruce, 7th Kentucky
 Henry Marshall, 5th Louisiana
 Otho Robards Singleton, 5th Mississippi
 William Mordecai Cooke Sr., 1st Missouri
 Thomas David Smith McDowell, 4th North Carolina
 John McQueen, 1st South Carolina
 William Graham Swan, 2nd Tennessee
 John Allen Wilcox, 1st Texas

Printing

Senators
James Phelan Sr., Mississippi, Chairman
Benjamin Harvey Hill, Georgia
John Bullock Clark Sr., Missouri — sessions 1, 2, and 4
Landon Carter Haynes Sr., Tennessee — sessions 3 and 4
 Representatives
 Ethelbert Barksdale, 6th Mississippi, Chairman
 Augustus Romaldus Wright, 10th Georgia
 Lucius Jacques Dupré, 4th Louisiana
 Thomas Menees, 8th Tennessee
 Albert Gallatin Jenkins, 14th Virginia (resigned April 21, 1862) — session 1
 David Funsten, 9th Virginia — session 4
 William Russell Smith, 2nd Alabama — temporary, session 4
 David William Lewis, 5th Georgia — temporary, session 4

Rules (Session 1)

 Senators
 James Lawrence Orr, South Carolina, Chairman
 Clement Claiborne Clay, Alabama
 Robert Ward Johnson, Arkansas
 William Lowndes Yancey, Alabama
 Representatives
 Thomas Stanley Bocock, 5th Virginia, Chairman
 Jabez Lamar Monroe Curry, 4th Alabama
 David William Lewis, 5th Georgia
 John Perkins Jr., 6th Louisiana
 George Washington Jones, 7th Tennessee

Notes

References
 The Historical Atlas of the Congresses of the Confederate States of America: 1861-1865, by Kenneth C. Martis (Simon and Schuster 1994)

 
1862 establishments in Virginia
1864 disestablishments in Virginia